David Gerson Semedo Neves Lima (born 6 September 1990) is a Portuguese athlete competing in sprinting events. He has represented Portugal at two European Championships and one World Championships. At club level, he competes for S.L. Benfica.

International competitions

1Did not start in the semifinals

Personal bests
Source:

Outdoor
100 metres – 10.05 (2.0 m/s, Madrid 2017)
200 metres – 20.30 (0.6 m/s, La Chaux du Fonds 2017)
Indoor
200 metres – 21.19 (Sheffield 2016)

References

1990 births
Living people
Athletes from Lisbon
Portuguese male sprinters
Portuguese people of Bissau-Guinean descent
S.L. Benfica athletes
World Athletics Championships athletes for Portugal
Athletes (track and field) at the 2018 Mediterranean Games
Mediterranean Games competitors for Portugal
Competitors at the 2013 Summer Universiade
Competitors at the 2015 Summer Universiade